Joshua Siegel may refer to:

 Joshua E. Siegel (born 1988), American mechanical engineer, inventor, and entrepreneur
 Joshua A. Siegel (born 1966), American orthopaedic surgeon
 Joshua Siegel (politician), (born 1993), American politician from Pennsylvania